Frederick Edward Robin Butler, Baron Butler of Brockwell,  (born 3 January 1938) is a retired British civil servant, now sitting in the House of Lords as a crossbencher.

Early life and family
Butler  was born in Lytham St Annes, Lancashire, on 3 January 1938.  He went to Orley Farm School and Harrow School (where he was Head Boy), then taught for a year at St Dunstan's School, Burnham-on-Sea, before attending University College, Oxford, where he took a double first in Mods and Greats and twice gained a Rugby Blue. He married Gillian Lois Galley in 1962. They have a daughter and two sons.

Civil service career
Butler had a high-profile career in the civil service from 1961 to 1998, serving as Private Secretary to five Prime Ministers. He was Secretary of the Cabinet and Head of the Home Civil Service from 1988 to 1998.

He joined HM Treasury in 1961, becoming Private Secretary to the Financial Secretary to the Treasury 1964–66 and Secretary to the Budget Committee 1965–69.

Early in his career, he was occasionally confused with his namesake Rab Butler.  Memos for Rab Butler, some highly sensitive, ended up on his desk, and some of his ended up on Rab's.  It was agreed that all memos ambiguously addressed to "R Butler" should go to Rab's office first, and then Rab's office would send on any intended for the other R Butler.  It is said that one day the young Butler, who was still playing first class rugby, received a letter that read: "You have been selected for the Richmond 1st XV on Saturday. Please be at Twickenham by 2 p.m.".  Underneath, in Rab's distinctive handwriting, was the message: "Dear Robin, I am not free on Saturday. Please could you deputise for me? Rab"!

In 1969, he was seconded to the Bank of England and several City institutions.  Later at HM Treasury as Assistant Secretary, General Expenditure Intelligence Division, he led the team which installed the UK Government's computerised financial information system 1975-77. He had been a founder member of the Central Policy Review Staff under Lord Rothschild 1971–2. After several senior appointments at the Treasury, he became second Permanent Secretary, Public Expenditure, 1985-87.

He was Private Secretary to Prime Ministers Edward Heath (1972–74) and Harold Wilson (1974–75), and Principal Private Secretary to Margaret Thatcher (1982–85). Along with Thatcher, he was almost killed in the 1984 IRA bombing of the Grand Hotel in Brighton. He was also Cabinet Secretary during the premierships of Margaret Thatcher, John Major and Tony Blair.

Other activities

After retiring from the Civil Service, Butler was Master of University College, Oxford, 1998–2008. He was announced to be made a life peer in the 1998 New Year Honours and was raised to the peerage as Baron Butler of Brockwell, of Herne Hill in the London Borough of Lambeth.

He became a non-executive Director of HSBC Group from 1998 to 2008. He is also Chairman of the Corporate Sustainability Committee and the HSBC Global Education Trust. In 2011, he was elected Master of the Worshipful Company of Salters. He is a Trustee of the Royal Academy of Music. 

In 2004, Lord Butler chaired the Review of Intelligence on Weapons of Mass Destruction, widely known as the 'Butler Review', which reviewed the use of intelligence in the lead up to the 2003 Iraq War.  The report concluded that some of the intelligence about Iraq's possession of Weapons of Mass Destruction was seriously flawed. The report also concluded, in regards the so-called Niger uranium forgeries, that the report Saddam's government was seeking uranium in Africa appeared 'well-founded'.

Honours and arms

Honours
Commander of the Royal Victorian Order (CVO), 1986 New Year Honours
Knight Commander of the Order of the Bath (KCB), 1988 New Year Honours
Knight Grand Cross of the Order of the Bath (GCB), 1992 Birthday Honours
Life peerage, 12 February 1998
Knight Companion of the Order of the Garter (KG), 23 April 2003
Privy Counsellor (PC), 2004

Arms

References

External links
Oxford University Gazette announcement of election as Master
The Arms of Lord Butler of Brockwell
For the story about Rab Butler's memos
Debrett's People of Today

1938 births
Living people
People educated at Harrow School
Alumni of University College, Oxford
Second Permanent Secretaries of HM Treasury
Cabinet Secretaries (United Kingdom)
Private secretaries in the British Civil Service
Members of the Privy Council of the United Kingdom
Crossbench life peers
Masters of University College, Oxford
Knights Grand Cross of the Order of the Bath
Commanders of the Royal Victorian Order
Knights of the Garter
HSBC people
Principal Private Secretaries to the Prime Minister
Fellows of King's College London
Life peers created by Elizabeth II